In the Ditch may refer to:

 In the Ditch (novel), 1972 novel by Buchi Emecheta
 "In the Ditch", song by Gang of Four from the album Solid Gold